Java AWT Native Interface (jawt) is an interface for the Java programming language that enables rendering libraries compiled to native code to draw directly to a Java Abstract Window Toolkit (AWT)  object drawing surface.

The Java Native Interface (JNI) allows developers to add platform-dependent functionality to Java applications. The JNI enables developers to add time-critical operations like mathematical calculations and 3D rendering. Previously, native 3D rendering was technically challenging because the native code didn't have access to the graphic context. The AWT Native Interface is designed to give developers access to an AWT Canvas for direct drawing with native code. In fact, the Java 3D API extension to the standard Java SE JDK relies heavily on the AWT Native Interface to render 3D objects in Java. The AWT Native Interface is very similar to the JNI, and, the steps are, in fact, the same as those of the JNI. See the Java Native Interface article for an explanation of the JNI techniques employed by the AWT Native Interface. The AWT Native Interface was added to the Java platform with the J2SE 1.3 ("Kestrel") version.

AWT Native Interface steps 

A complete walkthrough example of this technology is available on Wikibooks (see link below).

Create a Java application 
See the Java Native Interface article for an explanation of the native keyword and the loadLibrary() method. A paint() method will be simply invoked when the AWT event dispatching thread "repaints" the screen.

Create a C++ header file 
Create the C++ header file as usual. (See Java Native Interface for more complete explanations.)

Implement the C++ native code 
Type this in a file named "NativeSideCanvas.cpp" and compile into a library. See Java Native Interface (JNI) for a more complete explanation. (For Solaris code and other operating systems see links below.)

Run the program 
One should run the file as usual. One should then see a window with, for example, a rectangle drawn in it. (See Java Native Interface for complete instructions.)

Note: One can notice that the AWT Native Interface requires the "jawt.dll" (or "jawt.so") to run with the application, so the easiest way to do that is copying the "jawt.dll". (should be in the .../jre/bin file path of the JDK's installation path.)

Native painting 
One can paint as if it is a native application. In Windows, the JVM will pass a HWND and other window information to the native application so that the application will "know" where to draw. It could use GDI to draw a Rectangle. The window information the native side needs will be in a JAWT_Win32DrawingSurfaceInfo structure (depending on Operating System) which can be retrieved with this line:

External links

The AWT Native Interface
Support native rendering in JDK 1.3

AWT Native Interface